Meridian High School is a coeducational secondary school with academy status, located in the New Addington area of the London Borough of Croydon, England. The School takes its pupils mainly from the Addington, New Addington, Forestdale, Selsdon and Shirley areas.

In January 2007, strong winds swept the roof of the school off. No-one was harmed and the school was fully repaired by April 2007. The school converted to academy status on 1 June 2013.

The school changed its name to Meridian High School in June 2015 to avoid bad assumptions of students that people had of previous students that attended the school. The school had previously been called Addington High School and before that Fairchildes secondary modern School.

The Prime Meridian passes straight through the school playground, hence the current name.

Secondary schools in the London Borough of Croydon
Academies in the London Borough of Croydon